Gunplay is a 1951 American western film directed by Lesley Selander. It stars Tim Holt and Joan Dixon. It reunited Holt and Dixon from Law of the Badlands. The film was originally called Gun Notches. Filming took place in late 1950.

Plot
A man named Sam Martin is killed, but when his son identifies the killer's name, no one has ever heard of him.

Cast

References

External list

 
 
 
 

1951 films
1951 Western (genre) films
American Western (genre) films
RKO Pictures films
American black-and-white films
1950s English-language films
Films directed by Lesley Selander
1950s American films